Percona is an American company based in Durham, North Carolina and the developer of a number of open source software projects for MySQL, MariaDB, PostgreSQL, MongoDB and RocksDB users.  The company’s revenue of around $25 million a year is derived from support, consultancy and managed services of database systems.

The company was founded in 2006 by Peter Zaitsev and Vadim Tkachenko.

Open source software
Percona maintains a GitHub repository for their open source software, which can also be downloaded from the Percona website.

MySQL database software:
 Percona Server for MySQL
 Percona XtraDB Cluster
 Percona XtraBackup
 Percona Operator for MySQL based on Percona XtraDB Cluster
MongoDB database software:
 Percona Server for MongoDB
 Percona Operator for MongoDB
 Percona Backup for MongoDB
PostgreSQL database distribution:
 Percona Distribution for PostgreSQL
 Percona Operator for PostgreSQL
Database Management Tools
 Percona Monitoring and Management
 Percona Toolkit

Other information
The company’s founders, Peter Zaitsev and Vadim Tkachenko co-authored with Baron Schwartz the book High Performance MySQL (3rd edition), published by O’Reilly.

References

External links
 

MySQL
Free software companies